Solid State Survivor is the second album by Japanese electronic music band Yellow Magic Orchestra, released in 1979. Later, Solid State Survivor was released in 1982 in the UK on LP and cassette, also in 1992 in the United States on CD, but many of the songs from this album were compiled for release in the US as the US pressing of ×∞Multiplies (1980), including the tracks "Behind the Mask", "Rydeen", "Day Tripper", and "Technopolis". Solid State Survivor is only one of a handful of YMO albums in which the track titles do not have a Japanese equivalent.

The album was an early example of synth-pop, a genre that the band helped pioneer alongside their earlier album Yellow Magic Orchestra (1978), and it also contributed to the development of techno. Solid State Survivor won the Best Album Award at the 22nd Japan Record Awards, and it sold two million records. In 2020, Jonathan McNamara of The Japan Times listed it as one of the 10 Japanese albums worthy of inclusion on Rolling Stone's 2020 list of the 500 greatest albums of all time. That same year, review aggregator site Acclaimed Music placed the record at No. 2876 on the most recent revision of its list of the 3000 most critically lauded albums, the band's only album to be featured on the list.

Overview

The album is also known for "Behind the Mask", which YMO had first produced in 1978 for a Seiko quartz wristwatch commercial. YMO made use of synthesizers for the melodies and digital gated reverb for the snare drums. The song has had numerous cover versions produced by other artists, most notably Michael Jackson. Alongside Quincy Jones, Jackson produced a slightly more dance-funk version of the techno classic with additional lyrics, originally intended for his best-selling album Thriller (1982). Despite the approval of songwriter Sakamoto and lyricist Chris Mosdell, it was eventually removed from the Thriller album due to legal issues with Yellow Magic Orchestra's management. Nevertheless, various cover versions were later performed by Greg Phillinganes, Eric Clapton (with Phillinganes as part of his backing band), Orbital, and The Human League, among others, before Jackson's cover version eventually appeared on his posthumous Michael album in 2010.

"Technopolis" is considered an "interesting contribution" to the development of techno, specifically Detroit techno, as it used the term "techno" in its title, was a tribute to Tokyo as an electronic mecca, and foreshadowed concepts that Juan Atkins and Rick Davis would later have with Cybotron.

The album's title song "Solid State Survivor" is a new wave synth rock song. The popular anime series Dragon Ball Z later paid homage to the song and the album with the song "Solid State Scouter" as the theme song of the 1990 television special Dragon Ball Z: Bardock – The Father of Goku.

This was YMO's most successful album in Japan. It was the best selling album on the Oricon LP chart for 1980, beating Chiharu Matsuyama's  – Godiego's  was the best seller in 1979. The album went on to sell two million records worldwide.

Track listing

Personnel
Yellow Magic Orchestra – arrangements, electronics, remix, cover conception
Haruomi Hosono – bass guitar, synth bass, keyboards, vocoder, production
Ryuichi Sakamoto – keyboards, vocoder
Yukihiro Takahashi – vocals, drums, electronic drums, costume design

Guest musicians
Hideki Matsutake – Microcomposer programming
Chris Mosdell – lyrics
Sandii – vocals on "Absolute Ego Dance"
Makoto Ayukawa – electric guitar on "Day Tripper" and "Solid State Survivor"

Staff
Kunihiko Murai and Shōrō Kawazoe – executive producers
Norio Yoshizawa – recording engineer, remixing
Mitsuo Koike – recording engineer
Masako Hikasa and Akira Ikuta – recording coordinators
Lou Beach – logo type
Masayoshi Sukita – photography
Heikichi Harata – art director
Bricks – costumes
Takehime, Fumiko Iura and Mayo Tsutsumi – stylists
Mikio Honda (Clip) – hair

Chart history

References

Yellow Magic Orchestra albums
1979 albums
Alfa Records albums